Molde is a city in Molde Municipality in Møre og Romsdal county, Norway.  The city is located along the Moldefjorden and the river Molde.  The city is the largest urban and commercial centre of the Romsdal region as well as the administrative centre of Molde Municipality and of Møre og Romsdal county.  The Church of Norway's Diocese of Møre is also based at the Molde Cathedral.

Molde has a maritime, temperate climate, with cool-to-warm summers, and relatively mild winters. It is nicknamed The Town of Roses. 

It is an old settlement that emerged as a trading post in the late Middle Ages. Formal trading rights as a shipping port were granted in 1614, and the town was incorporated through a royal charter in 1742. Molde Municipality was established on 1 January 1838 (see formannskapsdistrikt law).

The town continued to grow throughout the 18th and 19th centuries, becoming a centre for the Norwegian textile and garment industry, as well as the administrative centre for the region, and a major tourist destination. After World War II, Molde experienced accelerated growth, merging with Bolsøy Municipality and parts of Veøy Municipality and Nord-Aukra Municipality on 1 January 1964, making the municipality much larger than the urban area of the town of Molde. On 1 January 2020, the municipality was expanded again through the incorporation of the neighboring municipalities of Midsund and Nesset.

Name
The town is named after the original settlement on the farmstead of Molde.

Pronunciation varies between the standard Molde and the rural Molle. A person from Molde will refer to him/herself as a Moldenser or Moldensar.

History

The town's current location dates from the late medieval period, but is preceded by the early medieval settlement on the nearby island of Veøya, an island to the south of present-day town of Molde. The settlement at Veøya probably dates from the Migration Period, but is first mentioned in the sagas by Snorri Sturluson as the location of the Battle of Sekken in 1162, where king Håkon the Broad-shouldered was killed fighting the aristocrat Erling Skakke, during the Norwegian civil wars. However, settlement in the area can be traced much further back in time—evidence given by two rock slabs carved with petroglyphs found at Bjørset, west of the city centre.

At the eve of the 15th century, the influence of Veøya waned, and the island was eventually deserted. However, commercial life in the region was not dead, and originating from the two settlements at Reknes and Molde (later Moldegård), a minor port called Molde Fjære (Molde Landing) emerged, based on trade with timber and herring to foreign merchants.

 
The town gained formal trading rights in 1614 as a ladested under the guidance of the city of Trondheim. During the Swedish occupation of Middle Norway, 1658–1660, after Denmark-Norway's devastating defeat in the Northern Wars, the town became a hub of resistance to the Swedes. After the rebellion and liberation in 1660, Molde became the administrative centre of Romsdalen Amt and was incorporated as a kjøpstad through a royal charter in 1742. Molde continued to grow throughout the 18th and 19th centuries, becoming a centre for the Norwegian textile and garment industry. Tourism later became a major industry, and Molde saw notables such as the German emperor Wilhelm II of Germany and the Prince of Wales as regular summer visitors. Molde consisted of luxurious hotels surrounding an idyllic township with quaint, wooden houses, lush gardens and parks, esplanades and pavilions, earning it the nickname the Town of Roses. This was interrupted when one third of the city was destroyed in a fire on 21 January 1916. However, Molde recovered and continued to grow in the economically difficult interbellum period.

A second fire, or series of fires, struck from the German air-raids in April and May 1940, which destroyed about two thirds of the town. Molde was in effect the capital of Norway for a week after King Haakon, Crown Prince Olav, and members of the government and parliament arrived at Molde on April 23, after a dramatic flight from Oslo. They were put up at Glomstua, then at the western outskirts of the town, and experienced the bombing raids personally. The Norwegian gold reserve was also conveyed to Molde, and was hidden in a clothing factory.

However, German intelligence was well aware of this, and on April 25 the Luftwaffe initiated a series of air-raids. For a week the air-raid siren on the chimney of the dairy building announced the repeated attacks. April 29 turned out to be the worst day in the history of Molde, as the city was transformed into a sea of flames by incendiary bombs. Until then the church had escaped undamaged, but in the final sortie a firebomb became stuck high up in the tower, and the beautiful wooden church was obliterated by fire.

After World War II, Molde experienced tremendous growth. As the modernisation of the Norwegian society accelerated in the post-reconstruction years, Molde became a centre for not only administrative and public services, but also academic resources and industrial output. After the consolidation of the town itself and its adjacent communities in 1964, Molde became a modern city, encompassing most branches of employment, from farming and fisheries, to industrial production, banking, higher education, tourism, commerce, health care, and civil administration.

Municipality
The city of Molde was established as an urban municipality on 1 January 1838 (see formannskapsdistrikt law). It was surrounded by the rural municipality of Bolsøy.  On 1 July 1915, a part of Bolsøy (population: 183) was transferred to the city of Molde.  On 1 January 1952, another part of Bolsøy (population: 1,913) was transferred to Molde.  

During the 1960s, there were many municipal mergers across Norway due to the work of the Schei Committee. On 1 January 1964, the town of Molde (population: 8,289) merged with the Sekken, Veøya, and Nesjestranda parts of municipality of Veøy (population: 756), all of Bolsøy municipality (population: 7,996), and the Mordal area of Nord-Aukra municipality (population: 77) to form the present day municipality of Molde, making the municipality much larger than the town.

On 1 January 2020, the neighbouring municipalities of Midsund and Nesset will be merged with Molde to form a much larger municipality called Molde.

Geography

The city is sheltered by the island of Bolsøya and the Molde archipelago, a chain of low-lying islands and islets, to the south, and the wood-clad hills of Moldemarka to the north. The city centre is located just west of the river Moldeelva, which runs into the city from the north, originating in the Moldevatnet lake, through the valley Moldedalen. Despite the river being minor and seasonal, it supported several sawmills in the 16th- and 17th centuries. This gave rise to the original town itself through a combination of a good harbour, proximity to the sea routes, vast timber resources, and a river capable of supporting mills. In 1909, the river housed the first hydro electric power plant capable of providing sufficient electricity for the city, and the upper reaches of the river still provide drinking water for most of the city.

Its panoramic view of some 222 partly snow-clad peaks, usually referred to as the Molde panorama, is one of Molde's main attractions, and has drawn tourists to the city since the 19th century. Molde is nicknamed the Town of Roses, a name which originated during Molde's era as a tourist destination of international fame in the late 19th century.

Moldemarka

Moldemarka, the hilly woodland area located immediately north of the town, is public land. The area has an extensive network of paths, walking trails and skiing tracks. Forest roads enter the area from several directions. Bulletin boards and maps provide information regarding local plants and wildlife, as well as signposts along the trails. Marked trails lead to a number of peaks, sites and fishing lakes and rivers. A national fishing license is required to fish in the lakes and streams.

Climate
The town of Molde has a maritime, temperate climate, with cool-to-warm summers, and relatively mild winters. The warmest season is late summer. The driest season is May–June. Due to its geographic location, Molde experiences frequent snowfalls in winter, but this snow is usually wet as the winters tend to be mild. Due to the effects of the Gulf Stream, the city rarely experiences lasting cold spells, and the average temperature is well above the average for its latitude.

A natural phenomenon occurring in Molde and the adjacent areas, are frequent winter days with temperatures above , sometimes even above . This is due to the foehn wind from south and south-east. Combined with a steady influx of warm, moist south-westerly winds from the Atlantic Ocean, warmed by the North Atlantic Current, it gives Molde a climate much warmer than its latitude would indicate. The sheltered location of the city, facing south with hills to the north, mountains to the east and mountainous islands to the west, contributes to Molde's climate and unusually rich plant life, especially among species naturally growing on far lower latitudes, like maple, chestnut, oak, tilia (lime or linden), beech, yew, and others.

Education
Molde University College offers a wide range of academic opportunities, from nursing and health-related studies, to economics and administrative courses. The school is Norway's leading college in logistics, and well established as a centre for research and academic programmes in information technology, with degrees up to and including PhD.

Transportation
The Hurtigruta ship stops at Molde every day, on its journey between the cities of Bergen and Kirkenes.  The nearest railway station is Åndalsnes, the terminus for the Rauma Line.

The city's airport at Årø has several daily flights to Oslo, Bergen, and Trondheim, as well as weekly flights to other domestic and international destinations.

Culture

Festivals
The Moldejazz jazz festival is held in Molde every July. Moldejazz is one of the largest and oldest jazz festivals in Europe, and one of the most important. An estimated 40,000 tickets are sold for the more than a hundred events during the festival. Between 80,000 and 100,000 visitors visit the city during the one-week-long festival.

Byfest, the city's celebration of incorporation, is an arrangement by local artists, coinciding with the anniversary of the royal charter of 29 June 1742.

Sports
Molde hosts a variety of sports teams, most notably the football team, Molde FK, which plays in the Eliteserien, the top division in the Norwegian football league system. Their home matches are played at Aker stadion, inaugurated in 1998, which holds a record attendance of 13,308. The team is three-time league champions (2011, 2012 and 2014), four-time Norwegian Cup winners (1994, 2005, 2013 and 2014), and has made numerous appearances in European tournaments, including the UEFA Champions League. The club was founded in 1911, during Molde's period of great British and Continental influx, and was first named "International", since it predominantly played teams made up from crews of foreign vessels visiting the city.

In addition to a number of international players, the city has also produced several ski jumpers, cross-country skiers and alpine skiers of international merit.

Other sports include the accomplished team handball clubs (SK Træff, SK Rival), athletics teams (IL Molde-Olymp), skiing clubs, basketball and volleyball teams.

See also
List of towns and cities in Norway

References

Molde
Cities and towns in Norway
Populated places in Møre og Romsdal
1742 establishments in Norway